The following tables compare general and technical features for a number of iOS e-book reader software. Each section corresponds to a major area of functionality in an e-book reader software. The comparisons are based on the latest released version.

Navigation features

Display features

Edit/tool features

Book source management features

Supported File Formats 

See Comparison of e-book formats for details on the file formats.

License

Special features

Discontinued software
 The Readmill app, introduced in February 2011, read numerous formats on Android and iOS devices but shut down on July 1, 2014.
 Also the Blio, DL Reader and Stanza app are no longer available.

See also 
Comparison of Android e-reader software 
Comparison of e-book formats - includes both device and software formats
Comparison of e-readers - includes hardware e-book readers

References 

iOS e-book reader software
IOS software
Ebooks